Edward Joseph Dunne (April 23, 1848 – August 5, 1910) was an Irish-born prelate of the Roman Catholic Church. He served as bishop of the Diocese of Dallas in Texas from 1894 until his death in 1910.

Biography

Early life 
Edward Dunne was born in Gortnahoe, County Tipperary, to Richard and Judith (née Cooke) Dunne. At a young age, he and his parents immigrated to the United States, settling in Chicago, Illinois. Dunne studied at St. Francis Seminary in Milwaukee, Wisconsin, and then at St. Mary's Seminary in Baltimore, Maryland.

Priesthood 
Dunne was ordained to the priesthood in Baltimore for the Archdiocese of Chicago by Bishop Thomas Becker on June 29, 1871.

On his return to Chicago, Dunne was named a curate under Reverend Patrick William Riordan (a relative and later Archbishop of San Francisco) at St. John's Parish in Chicago. He was transferred in 1873 to St. Mary's Parish, then in 1875 was named pastor of All Saints Parish, both in Chicago. Dunne build a church at All Saints in 1880 and a parochial school.. He also served as financial overseer for the archdiocese.

In early 1884, Dunne was sent to St. Anthony of Padua Parish in San Antonio, Florida for health reasons. Spending six months in San Antonio, he was credited by The Catholic Review with advancing the development of a Catholic school. Two weeks after Easter on April 29, 1884, largely due to Dunne's efforts, St. Anthony Catholic School was officially established and began holding formal classes in the parish church. Dunne returned to All Saints Church in Chicago later in 1884.

Bishop of Dallas 
On September 24, 1893, Dunne was appointed the second bishop of the Diocese of Dallas by Pope Leo XIII. He received his episcopal consecration on November 30 , 1893, from Archbishop Patrick Feehan, with Bishops James Ryan and John Samuel Foley serving as co-consecrators, at All Saints. He was installed in Dallas in January. 

During his tenure, Dunne opened several educational institutions, including Holy Trinity College (later named the University of Dallas). He established St. Paul Sanitarium in Dallas, and St. Anthony's Sanitarium, which was the first hospital in Amarillo. He also erected Sacred Heart Cathedral. During his sixteen years as bishop, the number of churches increased from 28 to 90, and the Catholic population tripled in size.

Death and legacy 
Edward Dunne died from a heart attack while visiting a friend in Green Bay, Wisconsin, on August 5, 1910, at age 62. At his brother's request, he was buried at Calvary Cemetery in Evanston, Illinois.

References

1848 births
1910 deaths
Irish emigrants to the United States (before 1923)
St. Francis Seminary (Wisconsin) alumni
St. Mary's Seminary and University alumni
People from County Tipperary
20th-century Roman Catholic bishops in the United States
Roman Catholic Archdiocese of Chicago
19th-century Roman Catholic bishops in the United States
Clergy from Chicago